Just Let Me Be is a 1950 novel from Australian author Jon Cleary. It was his third published full-length novel.

Premise
Joe Brennan, an ex-serviceman, returns home to Coogee after World War II. He gets a job as a milkman and intends to make enough money to marry his girlfriend Connie. He accidentally kills a man while defending local gangster Bill Pepper and is persuaded to hide the body.

Awards
The novel won the 1950 Australian Literature Society Gold Medal.

Adaptations
The novel was adapted for British TV in 1957.

Republication
The novel was later republished in 1990 under the title You, the Jury.

References

External links
Serialisation of novel in The Australian Women's Weekly 26 May 1954: 65 Supplement Accessed 6 March 2012
Just Let Me Be at AustLit (subscription required)
You, the Jury at AustLit (subscription required)

1950 Australian novels
Novels set in New South Wales
Novels by Jon Cleary
ALS Gold Medal winning works